James Stephen Spence (born 26 May 1963) is an English professional golfer.

Career
Spence was born in Tunbridge Wells, Kent. He turned professional in 1985 and has finished in the top 100 on the European Tour Order of Merit more than a dozen times, with a best placing of tenth in 1992. His two European Tour wins came at the 1992 Canon European Masters and the 2000 Moroccan Open.

In 2003 he succeeded Mark James as the Chairman of The European Tour's Tournament Committee.

Spence also appeared on the Sky TV scientific programme Brainiac: Science Abuse where he took part in "Brainiac Golf", in which a Brainiac went head to head against Spence. Every time a ball was putted it set off a fuse which ignited a caravan filled with a unique chemical compound, e.g. lead nitrate, which coloured the explosive flame.

Spence also has a radio show named in his honour, 'The Jamie Spence Show' on Bolton FM.

Professional wins (3)

European Tour wins (2)

European Tour playoff record (1–0)

Challenge Tour wins (1)
1989 Open della Pinetina

Results in major championships

Note: Spence only played in The Open Championship.

CUT = missed the half-way cut
"T" = tied

Team appearances
Professional
Alfred Dunhill Cup (representing England): 1992 (winners), 2000
World Cup (representing England): 2000

See also
List of people from Royal Tunbridge Wells

References

External links

English male golfers
European Tour golfers
European Senior Tour golfers
PGA Tour Champions golfers
People educated at The Skinners' School
People from Royal Tunbridge Wells
1963 births
Living people